Panagiotis Katsiaros  (born 8 May 1978) is a Greek former professional footballer who played as a left back. He now works as a manager in the youth academies of amateur Thessaloniki based football club Ethnikos Pylea.

Career
He played for AEL in the Greek Super League, where he was the oldest member of the squad, playing from January 2005 to May 2012.

Katsiaros has also previously played in the Greek Super League for Aris, Panionios and Kerkyra.

References

External links
Katsiaros's profile at Insports 

Katsiaros's profile at Guardian

1978 births
Living people
Greek footballers
Aris Thessaloniki F.C. players
Panionios F.C. players
Athlitiki Enosi Larissa F.C. players
Footballers from Thessaloniki
Association football fullbacks
Greece under-21 international footballers